Norristown Academy was a private preparatory academy established in 1805 in Norristown, Pennsylvania. Many prominent people have been educated there, including Major General Winfield Scott Hancock, Governor David Rittenhouse Porter, James Madison Porter, and Samuel Medary. It was torn down in 1829.

References

Academy
Defunct schools in Pennsylvania
Educational institutions established in 1804
1804 establishments in Pennsylvania
Demolished buildings and structures in Pennsylvania
Buildings and structures demolished in 1829